1128 may also refer to:

 1128 (number), a number in the 1000s range
 AD 1128 (MCXXVIII), a year in the Common Era
 1128 BC, the year before the common era
 Highway 1128, several roads and highways
 1128 Astrid, asteroid #1128, the 1128th asteroid registered, an asteroid in the Main Belt
 M1128 Mobile Gun System (model 1128 MGS) a U.S. Army gun vehicle based on a modified Stryker
 XM1128 (experimental model 1128) a 155mm boosted artillery round, a variant of the 1128 munition
 , pennant SP-1128, numbered 1128, a WWI U.S.Navy ocean-going tug

See also

 United Nations Security Council Resolution 1128
 DOI 10.1128, a prefix for microbiology
 B.1.1.28, a variant of the COVID-19 SARS-CoV-2 virus that was predominant in Brazil in the second half of 2020
 
 Il-28 (disambiguation) (ie. Il28)
 128 (disambiguation)